The term Vital Center was first coined by the Harvard historian Arthur M. Schlesinger Jr. in his 1949 book of that title. However, he objected to the domestic use of the phrase:

US President Bill Clinton started to use the phrase "vital center" in speeches given during his term of office. Schlesinger noted an article for Slate magazine that Clinton hoped to appropriate the term to mean "middle of the road" or something that his "DLC fans" might prefer its meaning to be, which would locate it "somewhere closer to Ronald Reagan than to Franklin D. Roosevelt." In the Slate article, Schlesinger strongly rejected that interpretation of the term and reiterated his argument from the 1998 introduction:

References 
 Schlesinger, Arthur M. The vital Center: The Politics of Freedom. Boston, Houghton Mifflin Co., 1949.
 Schlesinger, Arthur M. "It's My 'Vital Center'".  Slate.  10 January 1997.

External links 
Schlesinger, Arthur M. Jr., THE VITAL CENTER: THE POLITICS OF FREEDOM - a brief excerpt -, (Boston: Houghton Mifflin Company, 1949)

American political catchphrases